Harvard Tarn is a mountain lake tarn  southwest of Yale Tarn in the central Tarn Valley, Victoria Land, Antarctica. The feature is one of four tarns in the valley named after American universities by the Victoria University of Wellington Antarctic Expedition, 1965–66.

See also
 Penn Tarn
 Princeton Tarn
 Yale Tarn

References

Lakes of Victoria Land
Scott Coast